Bhotiyas are people of presumed Tibetan heritage that live along the Indo-Tibetan border in the upper reaches of the Great Himalayas, at elevations ranging from  to . In Uttarakhand, they inhabit seven river valleys, three in the Garhwal division (Jadh, Mana and Niti) and four in the Kumaon division (Johar, Darma, Byans and Chaudans). Their main traditional occupation used to be Indo-Tibetan trade, with limited amounts of agriculture and pastoralism. The customary Indo-Tibetan trade drastically stopped following the 1962 Sino-Indian war, and was resumed in the early 1990s under state-regulated mechanisms. These days, medicinal and aromatic plant collection is a major livelihood among this group, alongside by out-migration for education and jobs. Transhumance and pastoralism have drastically reduced in prevalence among this group too. They follow Hinduism and Buddhism and traditionally speak West Himalayish languages.

Etymology 
The name, Bhotiya (also spelt "Bhotia"), derives from the word Bod (བོད་), which is the Classical Tibetan name for Tibet. It was the term used by the British to refer to the borderland people, due to a presumed resemblance to the Tibetans. The Government of India continues to use the term.

Bhotiyas themselves self-describe themselves as Rung. Possible etymologies of the term include the Byangko word for mountain and the Tibetan term for valley (Rang-skad = valley language).

The Kumaonis refer to them as Shauka which means 'money' or 'rich'.

Ethnic groups
The Bhotiyas of Uttarakhand are scattered over the seven main river valleys in the three border districts of Pithoragarh, Chamoli and Uttarkashi. The seven major Bhotiya groups in Uttarakhand are the Johari, Darmiya, Chaudansi, Byansi, Marchha (Mana Valley), Tolchha (Niti Valley) and Jadh.

Rangkas
The isolated Rangkas (Rang, Rung) tribe has a population of 600 and is found in the outskirts of the Mahakali valley. According to Ethnologue, the Rangkas are ethnically related or are of the Johar tribe.

Byansis
The religion practised by the Byansis leans towards Bön-Animism, with influences from Tibetan Buddhism and Hinduism.

Jadh
The Jad people are Bhotiyas who lived in Nelang and Jadung valley, some were relocated to the Bhagirathi valley area after the 1960s Indo-China political conflict. The religion practiced by Jad people is Tibetan Buddhism

Rongpa

The rongpas were the major bhotiya subgroup they lives at the indo tibetan border of chamoli and rudraprayag the religion practiced by rongpas are Hinduism their  Ishta Devta is Badrinath, Pandavas and  Kedarnath.

Social status
, the Uttarakhandi Bhotiyas were classified as a Scheduled Tribe under the Indian government's reservation program of positive discrimination.

Population

As per the 2011 Census, there were a total of 39,106 Bhotia in Uttarakhand with ST status. Of them, 31,916 were Hindus and 7,190 were Buddhists. The most popular languages among the Bhotia are Kumauni (13,150 speakers), Garhwali (5,765), Hindi (5,809), Bhotia (7,592), Halam (5,300) and Rongpa (481).

There were a total of 510 births in 2010, corresponding to a birth rate of 13.04 per 1,000.

See also
 Jad people 
 Darma Valley
 Rung community

References

Further reading

External links
Rongpas of niti-mana ghati

Ethnic groups in India
Social groups of Uttarakhand
Scheduled Tribes of Uttarakhand